Cellariopsis deubeli is a species of air-breathing land snail, a terrestrial pulmonate gastropod mollusk in the family Oxychilidae.

Distribution 
This species occurs in Slovakia.

References

 Bank, R. A.; Neubert, E. (2017). Checklist of the land and freshwater Gastropoda of Europe. Last update: July 16th, 2017
 Sysoev, A. V. & Schileyko, A. A. (2009). Land snails and slugs of Russia and adjacent countries. Sofia/Moskva (Pensoft). 312 pp., 142 plates

Cellariopsis
Gastropods described in 1914